The Bangladeshi High Commissioner to Canada is the official representative of the Government of Bangladesh to the Government of Canada.

List of representatives

References 

Canada
 
Bangladesh